The 2022 United States House of Representatives elections in Alabama were held on November 8, 2022, to elect the seven U.S. representatives from the state of Alabama, one from each of the state's seven congressional districts. The elections coincided with other elections to the House of Representatives, elections to the United States Senate, and various state and local elections.

Primaries in Alabama took place on May 24. Should any race result in no candidate receiving over 50% of the vote, runoff elections would occur on June 21.

Background
Following redistricting as a result of the 2020 United States census, the Republican-controlled Alabama Legislature adopted a new congressional map in the autumn of 2021. The map drew one of Alabama's seven congressional districts with an African-American majority population; a single African-American majority congressional district has been the case for over 30 years. Three federal judges denied this map on January 24, 2022, stating that Alabama, which has an African-American population of 27% as of 2022, needed two congressional districts that were likely to elect African-American representatives, in accordance with the Voting Rights Act of 1965. John Wahl, the chairman of the Alabama Republican Party, said he expected the court's decision to be appealed. The office of the Attorney General of Alabama began the process of an appeal on January 25, 2022. The qualifying deadline for congressional candidates was also extended from January 28 to February 11.

The New York Times predicted that the appeal would go to the U.S. Supreme Court to address the practice of racial gerrymandering in the United States. If a second African-American majority district was upheld and passed, it would have been a significant pick-up for Democrats in Alabama. In response to the federal ruling, Representative Jerry Carl stated during a radio interview that his campaign was considering alternative strategies in the event that he was forced to run against fellow Representative Barry Moore. Chairman Wahl stated on January 28 that the Republican Party would plan to win all seven congressional seats if a new map created two competitive seats with slight African-American majorities, rather than one district guaranteed for a Democratic victory.

Ultimately, the case went to the Supreme Court, which ruled in a 5–4 decision on February 7, 2022, that Alabama's request for a stay would be granted, halting the three-judge panel's decision, upholding the state's original map and signifying a victory for Republicans in Alabama. Justice Brett Kavanaugh, joined by Samuel Alito, wrote a majority opinion, with Elena Kagan authoring a dissent.

The decision created some confusion over whether the extension for the filing deadline had been overturned as well; Secretary of State John Merrill clarified that the deadline would be left up to the parties. While the Democratic Party confirmed that it would keep its deadline as February 11, the Republican deadline was left unclear. This led to disputes over the eligibility for candidates to qualify for Republican primaries, specifically Jeff Coleman in district 2, and Jamie Aiken in district 6. Republican chairman John Wahl stated that the party would commit to state laws and party bylaws regarding the controversy. Following legal action, the U.S. District Court for Northern Alabama ruled against Coleman on February 25, 2022, establishing that it could not force the Alabama Republican Party to list the candidate's name on the ballot.

District 1

The 1st district encompasses Washington, Mobile, Baldwin, Escambia and Monroe counties, including the cities of Mobile, Bay Minette, Foley, and Monroeville. The incumbent is Republican Jerry Carl, who has represented the district since 2021 and was elected with 64.4% of the vote in 2020.

No Democratic candidates qualified to run in this district, initially leaving Carl unopposed. However, the Libertarian Party qualified for ballot access in May 2022, presenting a general election challenge to Carl.

Republican primary

Candidates

Nominee
Jerry Carl, incumbent U.S. Representative

Failed to qualify
Peter Alcorn

Libertarian nomination
No primary was held for Libertarian candidates, and were instead nominated by the party.

Nominee
Alexander Remrey, tech support specialist and Army veteran

General election

Endorsements

Predictions

Results

District 2

The 2nd district encompasses most of the Montgomery metropolitan area, and stretches into the Wiregrass Region in the southeastern portion of the state, including Andalusia, Dothan, Greenville, and Troy. The incumbent is Republican Barry Moore, who was elected with 65.2% of the vote in 2020.

Businessman and 2020 candidate Jeff Coleman attempted to launch a primary challenge against Moore, and even purchased an advertisement campaign including airtime during Super Bowl LVI in local markets. However, a federal panel ruled against his candidacy, as he qualified after the Supreme Court upheld Alabama's original congressional map and qualifying dates.

Republican primary

Candidates

Nominee
Barry Moore, incumbent U.S. Representative

Failed to qualify
Jeff Coleman, businessman and candidate for this seat in 2020

Endorsements

Democratic primary

Candidates

Nominee
Phyllis Harvey-Hall, education consultant, retired teacher and Democratic nominee for this seat in 2020

Eliminated in primary
Vimal Patel, real estate broker (endorsed Harvey-Hall)

Withdrawn
Terell Anderson, graphic designer and progressive activist (endorsed Harvey-Hall)
Jack Slate, tutor (endorsed Harvey-Hall)

Endorsements

Results

Libertarian nomination
No primary was held for Libertarian candidates, and were instead nominated by the party.

Nominee
Jonathan Realz, actor and activist

General election

Predictions

Endorsements

Results

District 3

The 3rd district is based in eastern Alabama, taking in small parts of Montgomery, as well as Anniston, Auburn, Talladega and Tuskegee. The incumbent is Republican Mike Rogers, who was re-elected with 67.5% of the vote in 2020.

Republican primary

Candidates

Nominee
Mike Rogers, incumbent U.S. Representative

Eliminated in primary
Michael T. Joiner, plumbing contractor

Endorsements

Results

Democratic primary

Candidates

Nominee
Lin Veasey, pastor

Libertarian nomination
No primary was held for Libertarian candidates, and were instead nominated by the party.

Nominee
Thomas Casson, former congressional staffer and candidate for this seat in 2014 and 2020

Independents

Candidates
Douglas "Doug" Bell, businessman, pastor and Republican nominee for Georgia's 5th congressional district in 2016 (qualified ballot access)

General election

Predictions

Endorsements

Results

District 4

The 4th district is located in rural north-central Alabama, spanning the Evangelical belt area, including Cullman, Gadsden, and Jasper. The incumbent is Republican Robert Aderholt, who was re-elected with 82.2% of the vote in 2020.

Republican primary

Candidates

Nominee
Robert Aderholt, incumbent U.S. Representative

Democratic primary

Candidates

Nominee
Rick Neighbors, manufacturing project manager, Democratic nominee for this seat in 2020 and former candidate in 2012 and 2018

Eliminated in primary
Rhonda Gore, teacher, former candidate for this seat in 2012

Results

Libertarian nomination
No primary was held for Libertarian candidates, and were instead nominated by the party.

Nominee
John C. Cochran, businessman

General election

Predictions

Endorsements

Results

District 5

The 5th district is based in northern Alabama, including the city of Huntsville, as well as Athens, Decatur, Florence, and Scottsboro. The incumbent is Republican Mo Brooks, who was re-elected with 95.8% of the vote in 2020, without major-party opposition. On March 22, 2021, Brooks announced his retirement and intention to run for U.S. Senate.

Republican primary

Candidates

Nominee
Dale Strong, chair of the Madison County Commission (2012–2023)

Eliminated in runoff
Casey Wardynski, former Assistant Secretary of the Army (2019–2021) and former Huntsville City Schools Superintendent (2011–2016)

Eliminated in primary
Andy Blalock, teacher and rancher
John Roberts, economic developer
Paul Sanford, former member of the Alabama State Senate for the 7th district (2009–2018)
Harrison Wright, podcaster and activist

Failed to qualify
Dexter Donnell, project manager
Doug Ehrle, sales program manager

Declined
Mo Brooks, incumbent U.S. Representative (ran for U.S. Senate)

Endorsements

Debates and forums

First round

Polling

Results

Runoff

Polling

Results

Democratic primary

Candidates

Nominee
Kathy Warner-Stanton, programming project manager

Eliminated in primary
Charlie Thompson III, car rental manager

Removed from ballot
Ben Gyasi

Endorsements

Results

Libertarian nomination
No primary was held for Libertarian candidates, and were instead nominated by the party.

Nominee
Phillip "PJ" Greer, Marine Corps veteran

General election

Predictions

Endorsements

Results

District 6

The 6th district encompasses Greater Birmingham, taking in parts of Birmingham, as well as the surrounding suburbs, including Bibb, Blount, Chilton, Coosa, and Shelby counties. Other cities include Alabaster, Hoover and Montevallo. The incumbent is Republican Gary Palmer, who was re-elected with 97.1% of the vote in 2020, without major-party opposition.

No Democratic candidates qualified to run in this district, initially leaving Palmer unopposed. However, the Libertarian Party qualified for ballot access in May 2022, presenting a general election challenge to Palmer.

Republican primary

Candidates

Nominee
Gary Palmer, incumbent U.S. Representative

Failed to qualify
Jamie Aiken, civics educator

Endorsements

Libertarian nomination
No primary was held for Libertarian candidates, and were instead nominated by the party.

Nominee
Andria Chieffo, Amazon supervisor

General election

Predictions

Results

District 7

The 7th district encompasses the Black Belt, including Selma and Demopolis, as well as taking in majority-black areas of Birmingham, Tuscaloosa, and Montgomery. The incumbent is Democrat Terri Sewell, who was re-elected with 97.2% of the vote in 2020, without major-party opposition.

Democratic primary

Candidates

Nominee
Terri Sewell, incumbent U.S. Representative

Endorsements

Republican primary

Candidates

Nominee
Beatrice Nichols, teacher

Libertarian nomination
No primary was held for Libertarian candidates, and were instead nominated by the party.

Nominee
Gavin Goodman, incumbent chairman of the Libertarian Party of Alabama and marketing manager

General election

Predictions

Endorsements

Results

See also
2022 United States Senate election in Alabama
2022 United States House of Representatives elections
2022 Alabama gubernatorial election
2022 Alabama lieutenant gubernatorial election
2022 Alabama Senate election
2022 Alabama House of Representatives election
2022 Alabama elections

Notes

Partisan clients

References

External links
Official campaign websites for 1st district candidates
 Jerry Carl (R) for Congress

Official campaign websites for 2nd district candidates
 Phyllis Harvey-Hall (D) for Congress
 Barry Moore (R) for Congress
 Jonathan Realz (L) for Congress

Official campaign websites for 3rd district candidates
 Doug Bell (I) for Congress
 Thomas Casson (L) for Congress
 Mike Rogers (R) for Congress

Official campaign websites for 4th district candidates
 Robert Aderholt (R) for Congress
 John C. Cochran (L) for Congress
 Rick Neighbors (D) for Congress

Official campaign websites for 5th district candidates
 Dale Strong (R) for Congress
 Kathy Warner-Stanton (D) for Congress

Official campaign websites for 6th district candidates
 Gary Palmer (R) for Congress

Official campaign websites for 7th district candidates
 Beatrice Nichols (R) for Congress
 Terri Sewell (D) for Congress

2022
Alabama
United States House of Representatives